Iaslovăț is a commune located in Suceava County, Romania. It is composed of a single village, Iaslovăț. This became part of the then-commune of Milișăuți in 1968. It remained so until 2002, when it was split off. The village is the birthplace of Communist politician Emil Bodnăraș.

References

Communes in Suceava County
Localities in Southern Bukovina